Cesare Ferrante (died 1593) was a Roman Catholic prelate who served as Bishop of Termoli (1569–1593).

Biography
On 1 April 1569, Cesare Ferrante was appointed during the papacy of Pope Pius V as Bishop of Termoli. On 16 April 1569, he was consecrated bishop by Scipione Rebiba, Cardinal-Priest of Sant'Angelo in Pescheria, with Giulio Antonio Santorio, Archbishop of Santa Severina, and Thomas Goldwell, Bishop of Saint Asaph, serving as co-consecrators. He served as Bishop of Termoli until his death in 1593.

While bishop, he was the principal co-consecrator of Prospero Vitelliano, Bishop of Bisignano (1569).

References

External links and additional sources
 (Chronology of Bishops) 
 (Chronology of Bishops) 

16th-century Italian Roman Catholic bishops
Bishops appointed by Pope Pius V
1593 deaths